Elusa subjecta is a moth of the family Noctuidae first described by Francis Walker in 1865. It is found in Sri Lanka, India and the Andaman Islands.

References

Moths of Asia
Moths described in 1865
Hadeninae